La Mafia is a five-time Grammy Award-winning musical group. It has its roots in the Northside neighborhood of Houston, Texas, and has charted a course as a Latin music band.

History 
La Mafia was founded in 1980 in Houston, TX. Vocalist Oscar De La Rosa & producer Armando Lichtenberger Jr. created an original style that survived various changes in the music industry. The band consists of Oscar De La Rosa on vocals, Armando Lichtenberger Jr. on Keyboard & Accordion, Rudy Martinez on bass, David De La Garza on keyboards and background vocals, Alan Lopez on drums, Victor Pacheco on Guitar and Robbie Longoria on bajo-sexto & percussion . In 2007 the band won 2 Grammys & 3 Latin Grammys and was nominated in 2009 for a Latin Grammy for the album Eternamente Romanticos. In 2020, the group won a Latin Grammy award for its 2019 album “Live in Mexico.”

La Mafia, seeking to expand their musical horizons, began touring extensively in Mexico and Latin America beginning in the late 1980s. The practice of Mexican-American artists performing in Mexico on a large scale  was unheard of before La Mafia.

Band members
 Oscar De La Rosa - Vocalist
 Armando Lichtenberger Jr. - Accordion, keyboards & Producer
 David De La Garza  III - Keyboards & Vocals
 Rudy Martinez - Bass guitar
 Alan Lopez - Drums
 Viktor Pacheko - Guitar
 Robbie Longoria - Bajo Sexto -percussions & Congas

Former members
 Leonardo Gonzales (brother of Oscar De La Rosa Gonzales) - guitar
 Robert Martinez - guitar & bass guitar 
 Marion Aquilina - guitar
 Israel (Speedy) Villanueva - bass guitar
 Adolf Alonso - bass guitar
 Tim Ruiz - bass guitar
 Tony Rodriguez - drums 
 Mario Gonzalez - drums
 Adam Mosqueda - drums
 Jason Rodriguez - bass guitar 
 Michael Aguilar - drums
 Jesse Moreno - Sax
 Jesse Peralez - Sax
 Rick Patino - Sax-Trumpet
 David Flores - Sax
 Joe Gonzales - drums
 Joe Ovalle - bass guitar
 Johnny Gonzalez - drums
 Eduardo Torres - drums

Discography 
Since 1993, La Mafia has recorded each of its hits at its own Urbana Recording Studios, including the million-selling Estas Tocando Fuego and [[Ahora y Siempre (La Mafia album)|Ahora y Siempre']]. The band has recorded 35 albums and CDs, not including dozens of compilation and greatest hits releases.

 Studio albums 
 1980: La Mafia de Oscar y Leonardo Gonzales
 1981: Only In Texas
 1982: The Magnificent 7
 1982: Honey (Cariño)
 1983: Electrifying
 1983: Mafia Mania
 1984: Hot Stuff
 1985: Neon Static
 1985: Herencia Norteña
 1986: La Mafia 1986
 1987: A Todo Color
 1988: Amame
 1989: Xplosiv
 1990: Enter the Future
 1990: Con Tanto Amor
 1991: Estas Tocando Fuego
 1992: Ahora y Siempre
 1994: Vida
 1996: Un Millón de Rosas (Grammy Winner)
 1997: En Tus Manos (Grammy Winner)
 1998: Euforia
 1999: Momentos
 2000: Contigo
 2001: Inconfundible
 2004: Nube Pasajera
 2004: Para El Pueblo (Latin Grammy Winner)
 2008: Eternamente Romanticos
 2014: Amor y Sexo
 2018: Vozes
 2019: Non-Stop

Compilations, duets, and live albums
 1981: La Mafia
 1984: 15 Hits
 1987: La Mafia Live
 1991: Party Time
 1991: 1991
 1992: Dancin' With La Mafia 
 1993: Nuestras Mejores Canciones - 17
 1995: Puro Tejano
 1995: Éxitos en Vivo
 1998: Hits De Coleccion Vol. 1
 2001: Para Enamorados
 2002: Tejano All Stars
 2003: Los Hits
 2003: 30 Éxitos Insuperables
 2006: Nuevamente (Latin Grammy Winner)
 2006: La Historia de La Mafia: Los Exitos
 2008: Leyendas
 2011: La Mafia: Live In The 80s
 2019: Live In Mexico 2020 Latin Grammy winner best tejano album.

 Awards and recognitions 
La Mafia received Grammy Awards for its CDs Un Millón de Rosas (1997) and En Tus Manos (1998) and Latin Grammy Awards for its CDs Para El Pueblo(2005),Nuevamente''(2006), and “Live in Mexico” (2020). It also has received eight Premio Lo Nuestro Awards and 12 Tejano Music Awards, including a Lifetime Achievement Award from the latter, numerous Billboard awards and was listed in the top 10 Billboard Latin Artists for the entire decade of the 1990s, ranking La Mafia as the most successful Latin artist Houston has ever produced.

La Mafia received the first Billboard Hot Latin Song of the Year (formally Hot Latin Track of the Year) in 1994 for their timeless hit "Me Estoy Enamorando."

References

External links

 
 

Grammy Award winners
Latin Grammy Award winners
Musical groups from Houston
Musical groups from Monterrey
Tejano music groups
Latin pop music groups
Spanish-language singers of the United States